Burneside railway station is in Burneside, Cumbria, England. The station is situated on the Windermere Branch Line from Oxenholme to Windermere. To the east of the station can be found the only two semaphore signals on the line guarding the manually operated road crossing. The station is owned by Network Rail and is operated by Northern who provide all passenger train services.

History

The station opened on 20 April 1847 as part of the Kendal and Windermere Railway. From 1880 to 1972 the station had a connection to the Burneside Paper Mills Tramway.
This line was subsequently acquired by the London and North Western Railway, and became part of the London, Midland and Scottish Railway at the 1923 Grouping. The station is reached via a short approach road from the centre of Burneside village. The two original platforms were staggered, with the up platform located on the Windermere side of the access crossing, and the down platform located on the Kendal side. Designed and operated as a busy mainline double track railway, through trains operated between Windermere and a variety of destinations, including London. Burneside station had goods sidings and a goods yard for freight services.

Freight services were ended on the line in 1972, and the gradual reduction in passenger services culminated in 1973 when the line was reconfigured as a single-track railway, resulting in the closure of the former down platform. All trains, in both directions, have used the original up platform since 1973.

Services

There is an hourly service to Windermere, and return to Oxenholme. A small number of services continue to Preston and Manchester. The station has been refurbished, and has a small waiting shelter, as well as other limited passenger facilities such as benches and electronic train information.

Until December 2012 Burneside was a request stop.

References

External links

Railway stations in Cumbria
DfT Category F2 stations
Former London and North Western Railway stations
Railway stations in Great Britain opened in 1847
Railway stations in Great Britain closed in 1855
Railway stations in Great Britain opened in 1857
Northern franchise railway stations
1847 establishments in England